"Sixteen Tons" is a song written by Merle Travis about a coal miner, based on life in the mines of Muhlenberg County, Kentucky. Travis first recorded the song at the Radio Recorders Studio B in Hollywood, California, on August 8, 1946. Cliffie Stone played bass on the recording. It was first released in July 1947 by Capitol on Travis's album Folk Songs of the Hills. The song became a gold record.

The line "You load sixteen tons and what do you get? Another day older and deeper in debt" came from a letter written by Travis's brother John. Another line came from their father, a coal miner, who would say: "I can't afford to die. I owe my soul to the company store." The titular "sixteen tons" refers to a practice of initiating new miners. In the mid-1920s, a miner tended to haul eight to ten tons per day, whereas for new miners, other miners would slack off so the new miner could "make sixteen tons on [their] very first day."

Tennessee Ernie Ford version 

The best known version was recorded in 1955 by American singer Tennessee Ernie Ford reached number one in the Billboard charts, while another version, by Frankie Laine in 1956, was released only in Western Europe, where it gave Ford's version competition.

On March 25, 2015, Ford's version of the song was inducted into the Library of Congress's National Recording Registry.

Authorship
The sole authorship of "Sixteen Tons" is attributed to Merle Travis on all recordings beginning with Travis's own 1946 record and is registered with BMI as a Merle Travis composition. George S. Davis, a folk singer and songwriter who had been a Kentucky coal miner, claimed on a 1966 recording for Folkways Records to have written the song as "Nine-to-ten tons" in the 1930s; he also at different times claimed to have written the song as "Twenty-One Tons". There is no supporting evidence for Davis's claim. Davis's 1966 recording of his version of the song (with some slightly different lyrics and tune, but titled "Sixteen Tons") appears on the albums George Davis: When Kentucky Had No Union Men and Classic Mountain Songs from Smithsonian.

The line "another day older and deeper in debt" from the chorus came from a letter written by Travis's brother John. This and the line "I owe my soul to the company store" are a reference to the truck system and to debt bondage. Under this scrip system, workers were not paid cash; rather they were paid with non-transferable credit vouchers that could be exchanged only for goods sold at the company store. This made it impossible for workers to store up cash savings. Workers also usually lived in company-owned dormitories or houses, the rent for which was automatically deducted from their pay. In the United States the truck system and associated debt bondage persisted until the strikes of the newly formed United Mine Workers and affiliated unions forced an end to such practices.

Other versions

Tennessee Ernie Ford recorded "Sixteen Tons" in 1955 as the B-side of his cover of the Moon Mullican standard "You Don't Have to Be a Baby to Cry". With Ford's snapping fingers and a unique clarinet-driven pop arrangement, it quickly became a million seller. It hit Billboard's country music chart in November and held the No. 1 position for ten weeks, then crossed over and held the number 1 position on the pop music chart for eight weeks, besting the competing version by Johnny Desmond. In the United Kingdom, Ford's version competed with versions by Edmund Hockridge and Frankie Laine. Nevertheless, Ford's version was the most successful, spending four weeks at number 1 in the UK Singles Chart in January and February 1956.

Laine's version was not released in the United States but sold well in the UK. Ford's version was released on 17 October, and by 28 October had sold 400,000 copies. On 10 November, a million copies had been sold; two million were sold by 15 December.
 

The song has been recorded or performed in concert by a wide variety of musicians:

 1955: The Weavers performed the song on their concert album The Weavers at Carnegie Hall.
 1955: Red Sovine recorded the song, released on the Brunswick label.
 1955: B.B. King & His Orchestra recorded on RPM Records.
 1955: Larry Cross recorded on the Embassy label.
1955: Marvin & The Chirps recorded on the Tip Top label.
 1955: Sung live by Elvis Presley on December 17, 1955, at the Municipal Auditorium in Shreveport Louisiana, but never recorded.
 1956: Ewan MacColl with Brian Daly recorded on Topic Records.
 1956: Michael Holliday recorded the song on the Columbia label.
 1956: Eddy Arnold version released on the compilation album Dozen Hits, RCA Victor.
 1957: The Platters recorded the song, released on the Mercury Records EP Millioniéme.
 1958: Chang Loo recorded a Chinese version that was re-released in 2017 on album Songs by Chang Loo Universal Records. 
 1960: Bo Diddley released a version on his album Bo Diddley Is a Gunslinger.
1961: Lou Monte recorded a version titled "16 tons (neapolitan version)" and it contained verses in both English and Italian in his famous style.
 1961: Jimmy Dean recorded a cover on his Big Bad John and Other Fabulous Songs and Tales album.
 1963: Alberto Vazquez, Mexican bass-baritone singer, covered this song for the market in Mexico.
 1964: Dave Dudley covered the song on his album Songs About The Working Man.
 1964: Louis Neefs, Belgian singer, played and recorded the song live in Belgium.
 1964: Harry Nilsson recorded a version for Tower Records.
 1965: Lorne Greene version recorded in the album The Man.
 1965: Tennessee Ernie Ford released another version of the song, "Sixteen Tons '65" (with largely the same lyrics as his first recording of the song, but with a substantially different musical arrangement) on a French EP of the same name.
 1966: Stevie Wonder recorded a version influenced by Motown and soul music on his Down to Earth album.
 1967: Tom Jones's version with a rock edge, on his album Green, Green Grass of Home.
 1967: James & Bobby Purify version as the B-side to their single "I Take What I Want".
 1967: Johnnie Taylor covered the song on his 1967 album Wanted: One Soul Singer.
 1968: Bobby Darin performed the song on the Jerry Lewis Show (Feb. 1968)
 1970: A psychedelic rock version by Freeman Sound as the B-Side to their unique single "Singing My Own Song".
 1971: Mylon LeFevre version recorded on the album Mylon with Holy Smoke.
 1972: A blues-rock version was recorded by CCS.
 1973: Jerry Reed recorded a version for his Hot A' Mighty! album.
 1974: Steve Goodman played it live at Columbia studios.
 1976: A country rock version by the Don Harrison Band peaked at #47 on the Billboard Hot 100 in June 1976. and number 53 in Australia.
 1984: Recorded by the Montreal band Deja Voodoo on their 1984 album Cemetery.
 1984: As part of a medley recorded live by Dutch singer Lee Towers on his 1984 album Gala of the Year.
 1986: A version by English punk band The Redskins on their 1986 album Neither Washington Nor Moscow.
 1986: Anna Domino recorded the song on her eponymous 1986 album.
 1987: Johnny Cash released a country version on his album Johnny Cash Is Coming to Town.
 1987: Frank Tovey performed the song on his album Tyranny & the Hired Hand.
 1989: The Gas House Gang (quartet) recorded a barbershop arrangement, written by David Wright (arranger), for their album Our "Rough and Tumble" Best, featuring their bass Jim Henry (singer); he would later sing this arrangement with another quartet, Crossroads (quartet). 
 1990: A rendition of the song by Eric Burdon was used for the opening to the comedy film Joe Versus the Volcano. Recorded in the early 1980s, it was not released until 1998 on the album Nightwinds Dying which is a different arrangement from the one heard in the film. In 1992 he recorded another version, which was released as the only studio track on the live album Access All Areas in 1993.
 1991: The musical style of Ford's version was used for a mashup with Money for Nothing by Big Daddy on their album Cutting Their Own Groove.
 1991: It was featured as a secret track on progressive thrash metal band Confessor's album Condemned.
 1992: A parody about golfing called "18 Holes" was written and recorded by John Denver. It was released on a rare single and occasionally performed in concert.
 1993: The San Francisco alternative metal band Faith No More covered the song before their cover of the Dead Kennedys' song 'Let's Lynch The Landlord' at their performance at the 1993 Phoenix Festival.
 1994: The Swedish doom metal band Memento Mori recorded a version of this song as a hidden track on their second album Life, Death and Other Morbid Tales.
 1995: Tuff, a hard rock band, included a version on their album Religious Fix.
 1995: A traditional roots country version was released by Corb Lund on the album Modern Pain.
1996: Serbian retro-swing rockabilly singer Srdjan Popov recorded a swing version of the song. It appears in Turkish documentary "16 Tons" directed by Ümit Kıvanç.
 1996: Western Flyer did a live comical version for their album Back in America (1996).
 1998: Hank Wilson (pseudonym of Leon Russell) included his version on Hank Wilson, Vol. 3: Legend in My Time.
 1998: Chicago band Hello Dave did a rendition on their 16 Tons album.
 1999: A slow, jazzy version by Stan Ridgway appeared on the album Anatomy.
 2005: A rock version released by Eels was on their live album "Sixteen Tons (10 Songs)".
 2005: Punk band This Bike Is a Pipe Bomb included it on their album Dance Party with...
 2007: Presidential candidate Dennis Kucinich's rendition of the song on 8 January received fairly widespread TV coverage.
 2007: Lawrence "Lipbone" Redding recorded the song for his album Hop The Fence.
 2010: Lance Guest, portraying Johnny Cash, on the original Broadway cast recording of Million Dollar Quartet.
 2011: Tom Morello, guitarist for Rage Against the Machine and The Nightwatchman; on the EP "Union Town", released by NewWest Records.
 2012: The Dandy Warhols, released a version of it on their 2012 album This Machine.
 2012: LeAnn Rimes was performing the song as part of her live show as of 2012.
 2012: Tim Armstrong recorded a version as a part of his Tim Timebomb and Friends project.
 2013: Robbie Williams included it on the deluxe edition of his Swings Both Ways album.
 2013: Hayseed Dixie released a rockgrass version of the song on their 2013 Grasswhooping album.
 2014: Gary Clail released a break-beat/dub version on his comeback album Nail It To The Mast.
 2016: ZZ Top included a version on the live album Live: Greatest Hits from Around the World, featuring Jeff Beck.
 2019: Old Crow Medicine Show released a version on the live album Live at The Ryman
 2021: Opening music of season two Confirmations episode of The Morning Show (American TV series) used Jerry Reed recording.
 2021: Geoff Castellucci of the vocal group Voiceplay released a version on YouTube.
 2022: Nina Hagen recorded the song for her album Unity.
 2022: Recorded by King Dude on the cover EP Songs of The 1940s • Part Two.

Foreign-language versions
 Armand Mestral released a version with French lyrics under the title "Seize Tonnes" in 1956.
 Olavi Virta with Triola Orchestra released a version with Finnish lyrics by Reino Helismaa under the title "Päivän työ" in 1956 (Triola, T 4249), for the 1972 album Olavi Virran Parhaat 3. (Sävel, SÄLP 717).
 A German version of the song did not translate the original lyrics, but rather rewrote them entirely, under the title "Sie hieß Mary-Ann". This was released in several versions on German record labels in 1956 and 1957, most notably by Ralf Bendix, and Freddy Quinn on his album "Freddy" recorded on Polydor.
 Spanish version "16 Toneladas" was recorded by the Spanish singer José Guardiola and became a hit in Spain and Latin America in 1960.
 16 tons (Neapolitan version) by Italian American singer Lou Monte recorded in 1961 with both English and Italian verses
 Italian version recorded by I Giganti, on the B-side of a 45 RPM vinyl record in 1968.
 Brazilian composer Roberto Neves wrote the Portuguese version "Dezesseis Toneladas", first recorded by Noriel Vilela in 1971, this version is a samba with happy lyrics unrelated to the subject of the original.
 Adriano Celentano released an Italian-language version "L'Ascensore" in 1986.
 Polish version, called Szesnaście ton has become popular among the local sea shanty bands. Because of that the song is mistakenly treated as sea shanty classic in Poland.
 A Chinese version called "靜心等" (Jìng Xin Deng, "Wait patiently") is a well-known hit in Taiwan, interpreted by Chinese singer 張露 (Chang Loo or Zhang Lu) and by Teresa Teng (鄧麗君, Deng Lijun).
 Hungarian punk band Hétköznapi Csalódások recorded a cover version in 1994 called "16 000 kg=1 600 000dkg" on their album Nyaljátok ki (Kiss my).
 Hungarian rock band Republic recorded a cover version in 1998 called "Tizenhat tonna feketeszén" ("16 tons black coal") on their album Üzenet (Message). Republic's lyrics uses lines from a Hungarian campfire song, a more literal translation of the original ballad.
 Hungarian music composer and singer Breitner János recorded and released a cover version in 1960 called "Húsz tonna" on 7 inch record EP. The lyrics is translated from the original, but for the number of syllables the 16 tons is changed to 20 (húsz) tonna.
 A slow, jazzy version by Finnish Turo's Hevi Gee appeared on the 1999 album Ei se mitn! as "Velkavankilaulu".
 Serbian hard rock band Riblja Čorba recorded a cover version in 1999 called "16 noći" ("16 nights") on their album Nojeva barka.
 July 2013, in Ukraine, the song was recorded by ukrabilly (Ukrainian folk) group "Ot Vinta!".
 A Mexican group Hermanos Barron from Monterrey, Nuevo León, Mexico recorded the song in the 1980s as "16 Toneladas".
 A Swedish version ("Sexton ton") was recorded 1956 by Cacka Israelsson and released as a B-side on the single "Tro och Kärlek". It was adapted into Swedish by Ingrid Reuterskiöld.
 Another Swedish version ("Sexton ton") was recorded in 1970 by Gunnar Wiklund. The song is about a truckdriver who drives 16 tons of wooden crates over the border.
 Alex To version in his 2014 concert. He sang both the original version and his mom's (Chang Loo) version.

In popular culture

 Disney animated the Ford version in a short D-TV music video with footage from Donald's Gold Mine and the Roustabout song from Dumbo.
 In the season 22 South Park episode "Unfulfilled", Ford's version of "Sixteen Tons" plays in the background of a montage of an Amazon fulfillment center.
 In The Simpsons episode "Bart Gets an Elephant", "Sixteen Tons" is being played on the radio as Bart is forced by Marge to do housework.
 In the pilot of The Marvelous Mrs. Maisel, the first band shown in the comedy club the Gaslight is playing "Sixteen Tons".
 In the game Fallout 76, set in a post-apocalyptic West Virginia, the song can be heard on one of the in-game radio stations.
 In the game Deep Rock Galactic, a cosmetic item called Sixpence references the song in its description.
 In Season 2 of The Big Bang Theory, Sheldon sings a verse.
 Eric Burdon's version of "Sixteen Tons" is used as the opening song of the Tom Hanks film Joe Versus the Volcano.
 Dwight Schultz sings a verse of the song in the first episode of the fifth season of The A-Team TV series.
 Morecambe and Wise danced with other dancers in a comedy parody beat music style routine, using this song as the backing track, on black and white TV in the UK in the 1960s.
 A reference to the song is made in the show Mystery Science Theater 3000 episode 912 "The Screaming Skull". The reference is made early during the Gumby short “Robot Rumpus” by Tom Servo.
 In season 3 episode 16 of The Blacklist the song can be heard in the graveyard scene at the beginning of the episode.
 In season 3 episode 7 of Mad Men the song can be heard during the credits.
 In the movie Back to the Future, Marty (Michael J. Fox) is seen in front of the record store in 1955 with a sign on the sidewalk that is advertising the Tennessee Ernie Ford records "The Ballad Of Davy Crockett" and "Sixteen Tons".
 Songwriter Rupert Holmes has cited "Sixteen Tons", in conjunction with the TV cooking program The Galloping Gourmet, as an inspiration for his song "Timothy", about a pair of miners who are implied to have cannibalized their fellow miner when the three are trapped following a mine collapse.
 The Rock-afire Explosion performed the song during their "Country Night" show.

References
Citations

Bibliography
 
 
 
 

1947 songs
1955 singles
Songs written by Merle Travis
Merle Travis songs
Tennessee Ernie Ford songs
Frankie Laine songs
The Platters songs
James & Bobby Purify songs
Eric Burdon songs
Billboard Top 100 number-one singles
Number-one singles in Australia
United States National Recording Registry recordings
Songs about labor
Songs about mining
Capitol Records singles